Asellus aquaticus is a freshwater crustacean resembling a woodlouse. It is known by various common names including pond slater, water louse, aquatic sowbug, water hoglouse and cress bug.

Ecology
Asellus aquaticus is common throughout the temperate zone including Europe, Russia, and North America. It is found in rivers, streams and standing water, particularly where there are plenty of stones under which it hides, but it is not found where the water is strongly acidic. It is a detritivore.

Asellus aquaticus is relatively tolerant of a range of pollutants and has been used as an indicator of water quality.

Life cycle and reproduction
Asellus aquaticus can breed throughout the year, if the temperature is high enough: they do not breed under cold temperatures. Maturity can be reached in few months under warm summer temperatures, but maturation may take as much as two years in permanently cold water bodies (e.g., high-latitude or mountain waters). Life span varies similarly: from 9 months in South Africa to 20 months in Northern Europe. Females carry eggs in brood pouches underneath their body.

Aquarium keeping
Aquarists worldwide are showing increasing interest towards A. aquaticus as a low-maintenance freshwater aquarium pet and tank cleaner. While often sold as live food for other fish, some keepers in the US and Germany have started selectively breeding A. aquaticus to be sold as pets, usually from online platforms like eBay.

Conservation

A number of subspecies are considered to be endangered including:
Asellus aquaticus carniolicus, endemic to Slovenia.
Asellus aquaticus cavernicolus found only in Italy and Slovenia.
Asellus aquaticus cyclobranchialis, endemic to Slovenia.

References

Asellota
Freshwater crustaceans of Europe
Freshwater crustaceans of Asia
Freshwater crustaceans of North America
Crustaceans described in 1758
Taxa named by Carl Linnaeus
Taxobox binomials not recognized by IUCN